Cleaton may refer to:

Cleaton, Kentucky, an unincorporated community in Muhlenberg County
Howard Cleaton, a former Welsh cricketer